Catherine Anna Yronwode (née Manfredi; May 12, 1947) is an American writer, editor, graphic designer, typesetter, and publisher with an extensive career in the comic book industry. She is also a practitioner of folk magic.

Early life
Catherine Anna Manfredi was born in 1947 in San Francisco. Her father was Joseph Manfredi, a Sicilian American abstract artist, and her mother was Liselotte Erlanger, a writer and Ashkenazi Jewish refugee as a member of the Kohn family of Nuremberg, in Nazi Germany.  She grew up in Berkeley, California, and Santa Monica, California.

She attended Shimer College in Illinois as an early entrant, but dropped out. Returning to Berkeley, she sold the Berkeley Barb underground newspaper on the streets and catalogued rare books for her parents' bookstore. In 1965 she left urban life for rural places.

Career

Early work
Yronwode began writing while in her teens, contributing to science fiction fanzines during the 1960s. She was a member of the Bay Area Astrologers Group, co-writing its weekly astrology column for an underground newspaper, San Francisco Express Times. She produced record reviews on a freelance basis for the nascent Rolling Stone magazine, and short articles on low-tech living for the Whole Earth Catalog and Country Women magazine. While in jail for growing marijuana, she wrote about her experiences ("Letters from Jail") for the Spokane Natural an underground newspaper.

With her mother Liselotte Glozer, Catherine co-wrote and hand-lettered the faux-medieval cookbook, My Lady's Closet Opened and the Secret of Baking Revealed by Two Gentlewomen (Glozer's Booksellers, 1969).

In 1969 she and her then-partner Peter Paskin created the joint name "Yronwode" and all of her subsequent work has been published under that surname. She generally styles her name in lower case, as "catherine yronwode."

Comics and trading cards
While unemployed in 1977, Yronwode created a magico-religious index to the Marvel Doctor Strange comics called the Lesser Book of the Vishanti; she later published parts of it in various small presses and it is posted on her website in updated form. Marvel writers are said to have consulted it.

In 1980, Yronwode began work at Ken Pierce Books, editing and writing introductions to a line of comic strip reprint books. Titles included Modesty Blaise by Peter O'Donnell and Jim Holdaway, Mike Hammer by Mickey Spillane, and The Phantom by Lee Falk.

Also in 1980 Yronwode succeeded Murray Bishoff as news reporter for Comics Buyer's Guide and began a long-running column "Fit to Print", presenting a variety of industry news, reviews, obituaries, and opinion pieces. Beanworld creator Larry Marder credits her positive review for his title's success. Similarly, when Dan Brereton received a poor review from Yronwode for an early project, he felt his "promising career in comics was over". The column, and her work with the APA-I comic-book indexing cooperative, led to freelance editing jobs at Kitchen Sink Press. She wrote The Art of Will Eisner in 1981 and produced several other books for Kitchen Sink over the next few years.

In 1983 she began a partnership with Dean Mullaney, the co-founder of Eclipse Enterprises, a comic book and graphic novel publisher which had been in business since 1976. With Yronwode as editor-in-chief, Eclipse published titles such as Miracleman by Alan Moore and Neil Gaiman, The Rocketeer by Dave Stevens, and Zot! by Scott McCloud. Eclipse also published graphic novels adapted from opera librettos, such as The Magic Flute by P. Craig Russell, and classic children's literature, such as The Hobbit by J. R. R. Tolkien. In 1983 Yronwode won an Inkpot Award, given for lifetime achievement in comics and related areas.

In 1985, Yronwode and the cartoonist Trina Robbins co-wrote Women and the Comics, a book on the history of female comics creators. As the first book on this subject, its publication was noted both by the mainstream press and the fan press.

During the 1980s, Eclipse developed a new line of non-fiction, non-sports trading cards, edited by Yronwode. Controversial political subjects such as the Iran-Contra scandal, the Savings and Loan crisis, the AIDS epidemic, and the Kennedy Assassination, as well as true crime accounts of serial killers, mass murderers, the mafia, and organized crime were covered in these card sets. Yronwode was widely interviewed in the media about her role in their creation.

In 1993 Yronwode and Mullaney divorced, at which point she left Eclipse and joined Claypool Comics, handling production, distribution, and typesetting for titles such as DNAgents and Elvira, Mistress of the Dark. In 1998 she was joined at Claypool by Tyagi Nagasiva. They married in 2000, at which time he changed his name to Nagasiva Bryan W. Yronwode. Both Yronwodes continued to work for Claypool until that company ceased print publication in 2007.

Legal cases

During her career as a comic book and trading card editor and publisher, Yronwode was involved in three court cases related to free speech/free expression under the First Amendment.

In the 1986 Illinois v. Correa obscenity case, which led to the founding of the Comic Book Legal Defense Fund, Yronwode was an expert witness for the defense.

In 1992, the convicted serial killer Kenneth Bianchi, one-half of the pair known as the Hillside Stranglers, sued Yronwode for USD$8.5 million for having an image of his face depicted on a trading card; he claimed his face was his trademark. The judge dismissed the case after ruling that, if Bianchi had been using his face as a trademark when he was killing women, he would not have tried to hide it from the police.

Also in 1992, Eclipse was a plaintiff when Nassau County, New York, seized a crime-themed trading card series of theirs under a county ordinance prohibiting sales of certain trading cards to minors. The case, in which Yronwode testified and the American Civil Liberties Union provided Eclipse's representation, reached the 2nd Circuit U.S. Court of Appeals. It ruled against the county, overturning the ordinance.

Other work

During the 1990s, Yronwode was a staff editor and contributor to Organic Gardening Magazine and wrote The California Gardener's Book of Lists (Taylor, 1998). Other subjects she has covered include collectibles, popular culture, rural acoustic blues music, early rock'n'roll, sexuality, magic, sacred architecture, the worldwide use of charms and talismans, African American hoodoo, and other folklore subjects. She runs the websites luckymojo.com, herbmagic.com, southern-spirits.com, and missionaryindependent.org, which deal with these and other topics, including comic books.

She is the co-proprietor, with her husband Nagasiva Yronwode, of the Lucky Mojo Curio Company, an occult shop, spiritual supply manufactory, book publishing firm, and internet radio network for which she produces graphic label art. She is on the board of the Yronwode Institution for the Preservation and Popularization of Indigenous Ethnomagicology (YIPPIE), a 501(c)3 not-for-profit foundation that archives the material culture of 19th and 20th century folk magic and divination. Since 2006, she has been a pastor at Missionary Independent Spiritual Church.

Under the imprints of the Lucky Mojo Curio Company, Missionary Independent Spiritual Church, and YIPPIE, the Yronwodes edit and publish books by a variety of other authors as well as their own works.

Extensive interviews with the Yronwodes can be found in Christine Wicker's survey of early 21st-century magical practitioners, Not in Kansas Anymore and in Carolyn Morrow Long's academic history of 20th-century occult shops, Spiritual Merchants: Religion, Magic, and Commerce.

Personal life
From 1965 to 1980, Yronwode lived as a rural back-to-the-land hippie at Tolstoy Peace Farm, an anarchist commune in Washington; the Equitable Farm commune in Mendocino County, California, and the Garden of Joy Blues commune in Oregon County, Missouri.

In 1967 Yronwode began a relationship with Peter Paskin; in 1969 they devised the new surname Yronwode. In 1970 they were interviewed at length by Rolling Stone magazine for an article on hippie anarchist communes. The couple had two children: Cicely (who was born in 1970 and died of SIDS the same year) and Althaea, born in 1971. In 1972, the Yronwodes relocated to the Garden of Joy Blues commune in the Missouri Ozarks. Their partnership ended in 1976.

After working and living together from 1983 onward, Yronwode and Dean Mullaney married in 1987. They divorced in 1993.

Yronwode lives on an old farmstead in rural Forestville, California, in "tantric partnership" with Nagasiva Bryan W Yronwode. They met in 1998 and married in 2000.

Bibliography
 My Lady's Closet Opened and the Secret of Baking Revealed, by Two Gentlewomen (with Liselotte Erlanger Glozer). Glozer's Booksellers, 1969.
 The Lesser Book of the Vishanti, 1977, rev. 2002, various private publishers.
 Will Eisner Color Treasury (with Will Eisner). Kitchen Sink Press,1981. 
 The Art of Will Eisner. Kitchen Sink Press, 1982. 
 Women and the Comics (with Trina Robbins). Eclipse, 1983.  
 The Outer Space Spirit: 1952 (with Will Eisner, Wally Wood, and Pete Hamill). Kitchen Sink Press, 1989. 
 The California Gardener's Book of Lists (with Eileen Smith). Taylor Publishing, 1998. 
 Hoodoo Herb and Root Magic. Lucky Mojo, 2002. 
 Hoodoo Rootwork Correspondence Course. Lucky Mojo, 2006. 
 Throwing the Bones: Foretelling the Future With Bones, Shells, and Nuts. Lucky Mojo, 2012. 
 The Art of Hoodoo Candle Magic in Rootwork, Conjure, and Spiritual Church Services (with Mikhail Strabo). Missionary Independent Spiritual Church, 2013. 
 The Black Folder: Personal Communications on the Mastery of Hoodoo (editor / contributor, with 17 other authors). Missionary Independent Spiritual Church, 2013. 
 Paper in My Shoe: Name Papers, Petition Papers, and Prayer Papers in the Hoodoo Rootwork Tradition. Lucky Mojo, 2015. 
 Legends of Incense, Herb, and Oil Magic: Esoteric Students' Handbook of Legendary Formulas and Facts by Lewis de Claremont, Restored, Revised, and Edited by catherine yronwode. Lucky Mojo, 2016. 
 This Amazing Book - Hoodoo Herb and Root Medicine - Opens the Door to Better Health by Sunrae Products Co., Restored, Revised, and Edited by catherine yronwode. Lucky Mojo, 2017. 
 The Art of Making Mojos: How to Craft Conjure Hands, Trick Bags, Tobies, Gree-Grees, Jomos, Jacks, and Nation Sacks. Lucky Mojo, 2018. 
 Genuine Black and White Magic of Marie Laveau (with Zora Neale Hurston, Anna Riva, Anne Fleitman (Henri Gamache), Larry B. Wright, Franz Hartmann, Abe Plough, et al.). Lucky Mojo, 2018. 
 The Secret of Numbers Revealed. (with Dr. Roy Page Walton, Lewis de Claremont, Godfrey Spencer, and Frank Householder). Lucky Mojo, 2019. 
 The Red Folder: Private Lessons on the Practice of Hoodoo (editor / contributor, with 48 other authors). Missionary Independent Spiritual Church, 2019. 
 Secrets of the Crystal Silence League: Crystal Ball Gazing, The Master Key to Silent Influence. (with Claude Alexander Conlin and Deacon Millett). Missionary Independent Spiritual Church, 2019. 
 Bottle Up and Go!: The Magic of Hoodoo Container Spells in Boxes, Bags, Bowls, Buckets, and Jars. (with Lara Rivera). Lucky Mojo, 2020.      
 The Stranger in the Cup: How to Read Your Luck and Fate in the Tea Leaves. (with Gregory Lee White). Lucky Mojo, 2020.  
 Terrors of the Evil Eye Exposed: Protection From Evil. (with Henri Gamache and Dr. Jeremy Weiss). Lucky Mojo, 2021.     
 How to Use Amulets, Charms, and Talismans in the Hoodoo and Conjure Tradition: Physical Magic for Protection, Health, Money, Love, and Long Life. (with Gregory Lee White). Lucky Mojo, 2021. 
 Down-Home Sex Magic: Hoodoo Spells of Bodily Love. Lucky Mojo, 2021.

References

External links

Official site

1947 births
Living people
American occult writers
American people convicted of drug offenses
American writers of Italian descent
American Ashkenazi Jews
Comic book editors
Comics critics
Hoodoo (spirituality)
People from Oregon County, Missouri
Shimer College alumni
Writers from Berkeley, California
Writers from San Francisco
Jewish American writers
20th-century American non-fiction writers
21st-century American non-fiction writers
20th-century American women writers
21st-century American women writers
20th-century occultists
21st-century occultists
People from Forestville, California
21st-century American Jews